

Women's

Tie breakers
 9-3 
 12-3

Men's

Tie breaker
 6-4 

2007 Canada Winter Games
2007 in Canadian curling
2007 Canada Games